Patange or patangey or pathange or pathangey is a surname prevalent among the people of Bhavsar caste, a sub-caste of marathas predominant in the state of  Maharashtra and Gujarat who have spread to the states of Andhra Pradesh, Tamil Nadu & Karnataka, during the times of Shivaji, along with other Bhavsar people.
But we can also see this surname in the bhandari caste, a caste predominant in the state of goa and konkan part of maharashtra.

References 

Indian surnames